Su íntimo secreto (English: Her deep secret) is a 1948 Argentine drama film, directed by Julio Irigoyen. It was premiered on May 15, 1948.

Cast
  Mercedes Carné
  Felipe Dudán
  Elvita Solán
  Alfredo Arrocha
  Héctor Miranda
  Perlita Nogueiro
  Alberto del Solar
  Enrique Vimo
  María Esther Cáceres
  Carlos A. Gordillo
  O.A. Binaghi
  Carlos Coria

External links
 

1948 films
1940s Spanish-language films
Argentine black-and-white films
Argentine drama films
1948 drama films
Films directed by Julio Irigoyen
1940s Argentine films